Baghdad Street may refer to:

 Baghdad Street (Damascus), in Damascus, Syria
 Baghdad Street (Singapore), in Kampong Glam, Singapore

See also
Bağdat Avenue, in Istanbul, Turkey